NGC 507, also known as Arp 229, CGCG 502-67, MCG 5-4-44, PGC 5098, UGC 938, and V V 207, is a lenticular galaxy in the constellation Pisces. It was described as being "very faint", "pretty large", "round", "brighter in the middle", and "south of NGC 508" by John Dreyer in the New General Catalogue. The two galaxies (NGC 507 and NGC 508) are a part of the Atlas of Peculiar Galaxies, where NGC 507 is described as "Circular or near circular rings of small density difference."

It was discovered by William Herschel on September 12, 1784.

See also 
 Lenticular galaxy 
 List of NGC objects (1–1000)
 Pisces (constellation)

References

External links 
 
 
 SEDS

Pisces (constellation)
Lenticular galaxies
0507
Discoveries by William Herschel
229
005098